Bageherpeton is an extinct genus of archegosaurid temnospondyl amphibian from the Upper Permian period of Rio Grande do Sul, Brazil (Paleorrota). It was found in the Rio do Rasto Formation, and was named in honor of the city of Bagé near where it was found. It was described from a lower jaw.

References

Permian temnospondyls of South America
Fossil taxa described in 2001
Taxa named by Mário Costa Barberena